The 1973 Southern Cross Rally, officially the Sun-Total Oil Southern Cross International Rally was the eighth running of the Southern Cross Rally. The rally took place between the 3rd and the 7th of October 1973. The event covered 3,245 kilometres from Sydney to Port Macquarie.  It was won by Andrew Cowan and John Bryson, driving a Mitsubishi Lancer GSR.

Results

References

Rally competitions in Australia
Southern Cross Rally